Cristian Daniel Piarrou (born 19 May 1988), is an Argentine football defender playing right-wing back.

Career

Piarrou began his playing career in 2007 with Gimnasia y Esgrima de La Plata. He made his league debut on 25 February 2007 in a 2-0 home win against Gimnasia y Esgrima de Jujuy.

In 2009 after making 32 first team appearances for Gimnasia, Piarrou dropped down a division to join Quilmes of Primera B Nacional.

External links
 Cristian Piarrou – Argentine Primera statistics at Fútbol XXI 
 
 

1988 births
Living people
Footballers from La Plata
Argentine footballers
Association football defenders
Argentine Primera División players
Primera Nacional players
Torneo Argentino A players
Club de Gimnasia y Esgrima La Plata footballers
Sarmiento de Resistencia footballers
Quilmes Atlético Club footballers
San Martín de Tucumán footballers